Frank Burton Ellis (February 10, 1907 – November 3, 1969) was a United States district judge of the United States District Court for the Eastern District of Louisiana.

Education and career

Born in Covington, Louisiana, Ellis attended the Gulf Coast Military Academy and received a Bachelor of Laws from the Paul M. Hebert Law Center at Louisiana State University in 1929. He was in private practice of law in New Orleans, Louisiana from 1930 to 1961. He served as a special assistant attorney general of Louisiana. He was a Member of the Louisiana State Senate from 1940 to 1944, serving as President pro tem from 1940 to 1944. He was National Director of the Office of Emergency Planning from 1961 to 1962. He was a Member of the National Security Council in 1961.

Federal judicial service

Ellis was nominated by President John F. Kennedy on February 2, 1962, to a seat on the United States District Court for the Eastern District of Louisiana vacated by J. Skelly Wright. He was confirmed by the United States Senate on April 3, 1962, and received his commission on April 12, 1962. He assumed senior status due to a certified disability on November 16, 1965. His service was terminated on November 3, 1969, due to his death.

References

Sources
 FJC Bio
 
 
 
 
 Minden Herald, January 14, 1944, p. 5
 
 Minden Herald, Minden, Louisiana, June 18, 1954, p. 2.
 Minden Herald, July 16, 1954, p. 3.
 Numan V. Bartley and Hugh D. Graham, Southern Elections: County and Precinct Data, 1950-1972, Baton Rouge: Louisiana State University Press, 1978, p. 122.
 Quoted in Clarence L. Mohr and Joseph E. Gordon, Tulane: The Emergence of a Modern University, 1945-1980, Baton Rouge: Louisiana State University Press, 2001, p. 227.
 

|-

|-

|-

1907 births
1969 deaths
20th-century American judges
20th-century American lawyers
Judges of the United States District Court for the Eastern District of Louisiana
Lawyers from New Orleans
Louisiana state senators
Louisiana State University Law Center alumni
People from Covington, Louisiana
Politicians from New Orleans
United States district court judges appointed by John F. Kennedy
20th-century American politicians